Torneo notturno (Nocturnal Tournament) is an opera by the Italian composer Gian Francesco Malipiero. It was first performed at the Nationaltheater in Munich on 15 May 1931. The libretto, by the composer, is based on works by Serafino Aquilano, Francesco Sacchetti and Tuscan folk songs.

The work is made up of seven scenes or notturni linked by instrumental interludes. The titles of the notturni are: 
Le serenate
La tormenta
La foresta
La taverna del buon tempo
Il focolare spento
Il castello della noia
La prigione

Roles

Sources
The Viking Opera Guide ed. Holden (1993)
Del Teatro (in Italian)

Operas
Italian-language operas
1931 operas
Operas by Gian Francesco Malipiero